Le Mans is a 1971 film depicting a fictional 24 Hours of Le Mans auto race starring Steve McQueen and directed by Lee H. Katzin. The film began as a John Sturges project, before he was replaced during filming. It features actual footage captured during the 1970 race held the previous June.

Plot
Top flight Le Mans racing driver Michael Delaney spots former rival Piero Belgetti's widow Lisa buying flowers in the days before the race; he then drives to the scene of the accident which killed her husband the previous year. He has a flashback of Belgetti losing control of his Ferrari, forcing him to crash as well.

Like many others, Lisa appears to feel Delaney was responsible, at least in part, for the accident. At the race she is understandably downcast while working through her emotions. In an awkward scene, Delaney looks for a place to sit in a nearly empty track commissary, only to ask Lisa if he may join her, claiming that it is the only seat left. There is obvious tension between them, but also respect and a hint of mutual attraction.

After 13 hours of racing, Erich Stahler spins his Ferrari 512 at Indianapolis Corner, causing teammate Claude Aurac to veer off the track in a major accident. Momentarily distracted by the flames of Aurac's car, Delaney reacts too late to safely avoid a slower car, striking the guardrail and then bouncing several times across the road, striking the guardrails on each side of the road multiple times, totaling his Porsche 917. Both survive, but Aurac's injuries are extensive and he is medevaced to a hospital by helicopter. Lisa appears at the track clinic where Delaney is briefly treated.  She is distraught at his crash, which stirs up emotions from Piero's passing she had been seeking to put in the past.  Delaney consoles her and rescues her from a horde of reporters. After he puts her in a waiting car, a journalist asks Delaney whether his and Aurac's accident can be compared to the one with Belgetti in the previous year's race. Delaney merely stares him down.

Porsche driver Johann Ritter senses that his wife, Anna, would like for him to quit racing. He suggests it, thinking she will be overjoyed. She demurs and says she would like it only if he likes it. He chides her a bit about not being entirely honest. Later the decision is taken out of his hands when team manager David Townsend replaces him for not being quick enough on the track. Anna tries to comfort him, reminding him that he was planning to quit anyway.

Lisa goes to Delaney's trailer to talk with him. After his brush with death she is even more drawn to him and despairs that he may meet the same fate as her husband, but Delaney finds the thrill too addictive to quit. Townsend enters and asks him to take over driving Ritter's car. After a moment's unspoken communion with Lisa, he follows Townsend who tells him "Michael, I want you to drive flat out. I want Porsche to win Le Mans."

In the closing minutes of the race the two Porsches and their rival Ferraris vie for the win, with Delaney in the #21 car and teammate Larry Wilson in #22. The Ferrari leading the race retires due to a flat tire, leaving Wilson in the lead and only Delaney's archrival, Stahler, to contend with. The faster pair quickly catches Wilson. Delaney passes Stahler for second place.

Slower traffic in his lane forces Delaney to brake, allowing Stahler to overtake on the left. Delaney drafts the German, then both move alongside Wilson. Delaney then takes actions that seem intended to guarantee a 1–2 Porsche win rather than going for first himself. Rather than try to pass Wilson, then possibly Stahler, Delaney switches to the right lane and drafts Wilson allowing both to pull up with Stahler. Then for good measure he bumps Stahler twice. When Stahler tries to pass again Delaney steers toward him, looking likely to bump Stahler again and send him into the guard rail, forcing him to throttle back and brake to avoid that outcome thus ensuring the desired 1–2 win for Porsche.

Cast
 Steve McQueen as Michael Delaney, Le Mans driver for the team Porsche
 Siegfried Rauch as Erich Stahler, Delaney's rival who drives for Ferrari
 Elga Andersen as Lisa Belgetti, widow of Delaney's former rival Piero Belgetti
 Ronald Leigh-Hunt as David Townsend
 Fred Haltiner as Johann Ritter
 Luc Merenda as Claude Aurac, Eric Stahler's teammate
 Christopher Waite as Larry Wilson, Michael Delaney's teammate who drives for team Porsche
 Louise Edlind as Mrs. Anna Ritter
 Angelo Infanti as Lugo Abratte
 Jean-Claude Bercq as Paul-Jacques Dion
 Michele Scalera as Vito Scaliso
 Gino Cassani as Loretto Fuselli
 Alfred Bell as Tommy Hopkins
 Carlo Cecchi as Paolo Scadenza

Production

Le Mans was filmed on location on the Le Mans circuit between June and November 1970, including during that season's actual 24 Hours of Le Mans race in mid-June. McQueen had intended to race a Porsche 917 together with Jackie Stewart, but the #26 entry was not accepted. Instead, he is depicted as starting the race in the blue #20 Gulf-Porsche 917K driven by Jo Siffert and Brian Redman. The race-leading white #25 Porsche 917 "Long tail" was piloted by Vic Elford and Kurt Ahrens Jr.

The Porsche 908/2 which McQueen had previously co-driven to a second place in the 12 Hours of Sebring was entered in the race by McQueen's Solar Productions, complete with heavy movie cameras capturing actual racing footage. This #29 camera car, which can be briefly seen in the starting grid covered with a black sheet (at approximately 17:51) and again at just before the 79 minute-mark (at 1:18:42) racing past the starting line, was driven by Porsche's Herbert Linge and Jonathan Williams. It did, however, manage to finish 2nd in the P3.0 class.

Additional footage shot after the race used actual Porsche 917 and Ferrari 512s, in competition liveries. In the crash scenes comparatively expendable technologically obsolete Lola T70 chassis were fitted with replica Porsche and Ferrari bodywork.

Though depicted as the factory-backed Scuderia Ferrari team, the 512's used were borrowed from Belgian Ferrari distributor Jacques Swaters after Enzo Ferrari balked at supplying cars due to the script's Porsche team victory. David Piper, driving a  camera car 917K that had a camera seat removed, lost a part of a leg as a result of a crash during filming.

McQueen had wanted to employ Christopher Chapman's new multi-dynamic image technique in the film, as had been done at his instigation with The Thomas Crown Affair, in which he starred in 1968. Chapman advised against it, much to McQueen's disappointment; in Chapman's words, "it was much too big a film, with too many writers; it wouldn't work that way."

McQueen and John Sturges planned to make a movie called Day of the Champion, which was going to occur at the same time that Grand Prix was in production; lingering troubles with getting production to start meant that McQueen (who rejected an offer to star in Prix) had to focus on other projects such as The Sand Pebbles (1966). McQueen formed his own production company in Solar Productions and came into association with Cinema Center Films to help make the film. Elements of the would-be movie would be re-used in Le Mans, which would start filming in 1970. Unfortunately, Sturges would drop out of the project when Cinema Center did not find the progress of the filming satisfactory (to the point where they wanted to replace McQueen with Robert Redford); Sturges was quoted as saying "I'm too old and too rich" to put up with trouble. Alan Trustman, hired to write the film after having written for previous McQueen features such as Bullitt (1968), suffered a falling out with McQueen and was fired from production, which would hinder further attempts in his scriptwriting career. Lee H. Katzin, known for television work, was brought in to finish the project while McQueen had to strike a deal with Cinema Center that saw him lose creative control.

Reception
On review aggregation website Rotten Tomatoes, the film holds an approval rating of 69% based on 13 reviews.

Documentary
Steve McQueen: The Man & Le Mans is a 2015 documentary film, detailing the actor's quest to make the 1971 film Le Mans, complete with interviews from his wife at the time Neile Adams McQueen, co-stars Louise Edlind and Siegfried Rauch, and McQueen's son Chad McQueen; it also includes recordings from John Sturges and Steve McQueen.

See also

 Le Mans 1955 (film)
 List of American films of 1971
TAG Heuer Monaco
Grand Prix (film)
Truth in 24
Ford v Ferrari

References

Further reading
 Michael Keyser, Jonathan Williams, A French Kiss With Death, Bentley Publishers, 1999 - A lengthy, profusely illustrated and very readable history of the making of the movie

External links
 
 
 
 

1970 films
1970s action drama films
1970s sports films
American auto racing films
Sports films based on actual events
Films directed by Lee H. Katzin
American independent films
Films set in France
24 Hours of Le Mans
Cinema Center Films films
Films scored by Michel Legrand
1970 drama films
1971 drama films
Films with screenplays by Harry Kleiner
1970s English-language films
1970s American films